Eupithecia infelix is a moth found in the family of Geometridae. It is found in South Africa.

References

Endemic moths of South Africa
Moths described in 1917
infelix
Moths of Africa